Christopher Seitz (born March 12, 1987) is an American former soccer player. He played as a goalkeeper in Major League Soccer from 2007 until his retirement in 2021.

Youth and college
Chris Seitz was awarded Gatorade's California High School Soccer Player of the Year award in 2004 while playing for San Luis Obispo High School under the tutelage of coach Bob Galarneau. He also scored four goals in his junior season, all on penalty kicks.

Seitz played college soccer at the University of Maryland for the 2005 and 2006 seasons. As a freshman at Maryland, Seitz won the NCAA national championship by posting a 13–1–2 record with a 0.89 goals against average. He was named College Cup Defensive MVP. During Seitz's two-year career at Maryland he registered a 28–5–3 record with a 0.77 GAA. He was the ACC Defensive Player of the Year in 2006.

Professional career

Real Salt Lake 
Seitz was drafted in the 2007 MLS SuperDraft where he was selected fourth overall by Real Salt Lake. In his first two starts, he had a 0–1–1 record and a 2.5 GAA. In 2009 Seitz played one game on loan for Cleveland City Stars of the USL First Division, a 3–1 loss to Miami FC, and two games on loan with the Portland Timbers, also of the USL First Division, both against the Carolina RailHawks. He was the first goalkeeper to face five penalties in one match. In three seasons in Salt Lake, Seitz was never able to un-seat veteran Nick Rimando as RSL's first-choice keeper.

Philadelphia Union 
On November 25, 2009, he was traded to MLS expansion franchise Philadelphia Union.
Seitz spent the first 22 games of Philadelphia's inaugural 2010 season as the Union's starter, before being dropped to the bench behind Brad Knighton. He posted a 1.80 goals against average, worst in the league for players with more than one start in goal. The Union did not extend his contract, making him available for the two stages of the 2010 MLS Re-Entry Draft after the 2010 season.

FC Dallas 
Seitz was selected by Seattle Sounders FC in the second stage of the 2010 Re-Entry Draft. A contract was agreed with Seattle, and he was immediately traded to FC Dallas in exchange for a fourth-round pick in the 2012 MLS SuperDraft.

Seitz started one game for FC Dallas in 2011, allowing four goals in a 4–2 loss to the San Jose Earthquakes. In 2012, due to an injury to Kevin Hartman, who was dealing with back spasms, Seitz started against Vancouver Whitecaps FC in a 0–1 loss for Dallas. Seitz started the next two games until Hartman was able to play again.

Seitz put his soccer career on hold for a brief time in September 2012, despite having no guaranteed contract for the upcoming 2013 season, when he elected to donate bone marrow to save the life of a stranger for whose bone marrow he was a match. Because of this act, he was later named the 2012 MLS Humanitarian of the Year.

Seitz continued to be primarily a backup goalkeeper for Dallas until the 2016 season, when he would start a career-high 28 MLS matches. He would contribute to the team winning two major trophies, the Supporters' Shield and the Lamar Hunt U.S. Open Cup.

Houston Dynamo 
Seitz joined Houston Dynamo on December 15, 2017 as a free agent. He started the first five games of the 2018 season before losing his starting spot to Joe Willis. He started three games in the 2018 Open Cup, keeping two clean sheets. The Dynamo would go on to win the Open Cup for the first time in club history.

D.C. United 
In January 2019, Seitz was traded to D.C. United in exchange for a second-round pick in the 2019 MLS SuperDraft.  Seitz didn't receive much playing time, serving as the second goalkeeper choice after Bill Hamid. He made his first start for D.C. United on July 18, 2019, in a 4–1 win against FC Cincinnati. He made 3 appearances across all competitions for D.C. United in 2019, while also making an appearance for their USL Championship affiliate Loudoun United.  Seitz's contract was renewed after the 2019 season.

Seitz appeared in 6 of D.C. United's 23 games in a shortened 2020 season due to the COVID-19 pandemic, keeping 2 clean sheets.  D.C. finished the season 13th in the Eastern Conference, failing to qualify for the playoffs.  He was re-signed after the 2020 season to a one-year contract.

Seitz made 4 appearances during the 2021 season as D.C. United finished 8th in the East, 1 point and 1 place out of the playoffs.

Following the 2021 season, Seitz left D.C. United. Seitz later announced his retirement from professional soccer on his personal Twitter account, on January 19, 2022.

International
Seitz earned his first full international call up for the game against Brazil on September 9, 2007, but did not see any playing time. He previously started games for the U-23 squad in the CONCACAF Pre-Olympic qualification tournament prior to the 2008 Olympic Games and was on the roster for the 2008 Summer Olympic soccer tournament.

Career statistics

Honors
Real Salt Lake

Major League Soccer MLS Cup (1): 2009
Major League Soccer Eastern Conference Championship (1): 2009

FC Dallas

Lamar Hunt U.S. Open Cup (1): 2016
Supporters' Shield (1): 2016

Houston Dynamo

 Lamar Hunt U.S. Open Cup (1): 2018

Individual
MLS Humanitarian of the Year Award (1): 2012

References

External links
 

1987 births
Living people
American soccer players
Association football goalkeepers
Cleveland City Stars players
FC Dallas players
Footballers at the 2008 Summer Olympics
Houston Dynamo FC players
Loudoun United FC players
Major League Soccer players
Maryland Terrapins men's soccer players
NCAA Division I Men's Soccer Tournament Most Outstanding Player winners
People from San Luis Obispo, California
Portland Timbers (2001–2010) players
Philadelphia Union players
Real Salt Lake draft picks
Real Salt Lake players
Rio Grande Valley FC Toros players
D.C. United players
Olympic soccer players of the United States
Soccer players from California
USL Championship players
United States men's under-20 international soccer players
United States men's under-23 international soccer players
USL First Division players